Ayoub Adila  is a Moroccan professional footballer who plays as a midfielder.

References

1996 births
Living people
Moroccan footballers
Association football midfielders
SCC Mohammédia players